Henri Teixeira de Mattos (1856–1908), was a 19th-century Dutch sculptor.

Biography
Henri Teixeira de Mattos was born in Amsterdam and was the uncle of Joseph Mendes da Costa and Joseph Teixeira de Mattos. He studied at the Rijksakademie van Beeldende Kunsten and was a pupil of August Allebé, Bart van Hove, and Frans Stracké, receiving his diploma from the Quellinusschool. He was the teacher of Abraham Beck and Abraham Lopes Suasso.
He died in The Hague.

References
Citations

Bibliography
Henri Teixeira de Mattos on Artnet

1856 births
1908 deaths
Dutch sculptors
Dutch male sculptors
Painters from Amsterdam
19th-century Dutch painters
Dutch Sephardi Jews
19th-century Dutch male artists